Raffaele Cutolo (4 November 1941 – 17 February 2021) was an Italian crime boss, leader of the Nuova Camorra Organizzata (NCO), an organisation he built to renew the Camorra. Cutolo had a variety of nicknames including 'o Vangelo ("the gospel"), 'o Princepe ("the prince"), 'o Professore ("the professor") and 'o Monaco ("the monk"). Apart from 18 months on the run, Cutolo lived entirely in maximum-security prisons or psychiatric prisons after 1963. At the time of his death he was serving multiple life sentences for murder.

Early years 
Cutolo was born in Ottaviano, a municipality in the hinterland of Naples, in a family without ties in the Camorra. His fatherless youth was spent in a close-knit Catholic environment. His father was an agricultural labourer who for years tilled a field as a sharecropper as a means to support his family. While still a child, the landowner told Cutolo's father that the following year the field would be used for a different purpose and that his services were no longer required. In desperation, his father turned to the local Camorra boss, whose word was law in the village. The boss invited the Cutolo family to his home and promised to settle everything. A short time later, the landowner changed his mind and the contract was renewed.

A bad student, violent and inattentive, at 12 Cutolo was already roaming the streets with a gang of teenagers, committing petty burglaries and harassing shopkeepers. As soon as he could drive he bought a car, both for prestige and because it allowed him greater mobility in his raids. At the age of 21, on 24 February 1963, he committed his first homicide. He killed a man whose girlfriend had been slapped by Cutolo due to an alleged insult. In the ensuing fight, Cutolo pulled out a gun and shot him to death. He was convicted and sentenced to life imprisonment, reduced to 24 years after appeal. He was sent to Poggioreale prison in Naples. Entering prison on a murder conviction made Cutolo a “tough guy”. In prison Cutolo learned the rules of the criminal world: he became a man of honour, paid respect to more powerful inmates, and started gathering personal prestige because of his striking personality. He never lost sight of his ambition and his desire to become one of the biggest bosses of the Neapolitan underworld.

Cutolo had established himself as a ringleader, when Antonio Spavone, known as "'o Malommo" (The Badman), was transferred to Poggioreale prison. He challenged Spavone to a knife fight in the courtyard (a practice called 'o dichiaramento, the declaration), but Spavone refused. The challenged boss allegedly limited himself to a reply: "Today's young men want to die young by whatever means." Spavone was released from prison shortly after this event. From his prison cell, Cutolo ordered the murder of Spavone. A hitman, allegedly Cutolo's friend, shot Spavone in the face from short range with a shotgun. Spavone survived the ambush, but the shotgun blast left considerable damage to his facial structure, which required plastic surgery. Spavone immediately resigned from his highly visible role as a Camorra boss.

Cutolo was soon able to gather under him a small group of prisoners, the nucleus of which would later become the leadership of the NCO. They were Antonino Cuomo known as "'o Maranghiello" (The Cudgel), Pasquale Barra known as "'o Nimale" (The Animal), Giuseppe Puca known as "'o Giappone" (Japanese), Pasquale D'Amico known as "'o Cartunaro" (The Cardboard picker) and Vincenzo Casillo known as "'o Nirone" (The Big Black). After being released, they would set up criminal activities on the outside which would be directly controlled by Cutolo from within the penitentiary system.

Nuova Camorra Organizzata 
From within Naples' Poggioreale prison Cutolo built a new organisation: the Nuova Camorra Organizzata (NCO). He began by befriending young inmates unfamiliar with jail, giving them a sense of identity and worth, so much so that when they were released they would send Cutolo ‘flowers’ (i.e. money), which enabled him to increase his network. He helped poorer prisoners by buying food for them from the jail store, or arranging for food to be sent in from outside. In such ways Cutolo created many ‘debts’ or ‘rain cheques’ which he would cash at the opportune moment. As his following grew, he also began to exercise a monopoly of violence within a number of prisons, thus increasing his power. By the early seventies, Cutolo had become so powerful that he was able to decide which of his followers would be moved to which jails, use a prison governor's telephone to make calls anywhere in the world, and allegedly even slap the prison governor on one occasion for daring to search his cell. Another key bond Cutolo created was regular payments to the families of NCO members sent to prison, thereby guaranteeing the allegiance of both prisoners and their families.

What is unusual about Cutolo is that he has a kind of ideology, another factor that appealed to rootless and badly educated youths. He founded the NCO in his home town Ottaviano on 24 October 1970, the day of Cutolo's patron saint, San Raffaele. In such a way Cutolo created the most powerful organization ever to exist in the Neapolitan hinterland. Using his personal appeal and almost magic charisma, he was able to achieve this single-handedly. Cutolo had strong ties with the Calabrian 'Ndrangheta. According to some pentiti, Cutolo's career started with his affiliation with the 'Ndrangheta, supported by important bosses such as Piromalli, Paolo De Stefano, and Mammoliti. Cutolo based his organisation of the NCO on the model of the 'Ndrangheta, its internal codes and rituals.

The NCO strongholds were the towns to the east of Naples, such as Ottaviano, and Cutolo appealed to a Campanian rather than Neapolitan sense of identity, perhaps as a result of his poor peasant background. For instance, Cutolo is once reported as having said: "The day when the people of Campania understand that it is better to eat a slice of bread as a free man than to eat a steak as a slave is the day when Campania will win."

The organisation was unique in the history of the Camorra in that it was highly centralised and possessed a rudimentary form of ideology. For example, he publicly declared that children were not to be kidnapped or mistreated and allegedly arranged the assassination of at least one kidnapper. Perhaps the most potent ideological weapon was the cult of violence, which sometimes bordered on a kind of death wish, as Cutolo once wrote: "the value of a life doesn’t consist of its length but in the use made of it; often people live a long time without living very much. Consider this, my friends, as long as you are on this earth everything depends on your will-power, not on the number of years you have lived."

Through his book of thoughts and poems, Poesie e pensieri and his many interviews with journalists, Cutolo was able to create a strong sense of identity among his members. The book was published in Naples in 1980, but never distributed to the public. The book, containing 235 pages of poems and pictures, was seized by the police and censored as an "apology of a criminal organization." According to the Justice department, this book was viewed by NCO members as the "Bible of the NCO" and was particularly popular in prison, due to Cutolo's own distribution by mail. Even though his book was impounded by magistrates within days of its publication, many prisoners, alienated from society both inside and outside jail, wrote to Cutolo and other NCO leaders asking for a copy. Its possession alone would later be considered incriminating evidence.

Cutolo openly supported the young inmates, who were confronted with abuse, brutality, physical aggression and rape. He provided them with advice and protection from the brutalities of other inmates. At the same time they learned how to behave as a good picciotto, the lowest entry level into the Camorra. Cutolo challenged the old Camorra bosses and gave the youngsters a structure to belong to: “The new Camorra must have a statute, a structure, an oath, a complete ceremony, a ritual that must excite people to the point that they would risk their lives for this organization.” Cutolo was revered by his soldiers. They called him Prince and kissed his left hand as if he were a bishop.

Cutolo spent a great amount of time researching the 19th century Camorra and reconstructed the old Camorristic ritual of initiation. He took great care in making the ritual a binding social practice. In his cell, he created a ceremony in which the initiate received the award of the primo regalo (first gift) also called abbraccio (embrace) or fiore (flower). He infused the old Camorristic traditions with Catholicism and reconstituted the ritual of initiation of the traditional Camorra.

Sister running the business 
In Poggioreale, where on average there were 25 prisoners to a cell, Cutolo managed to get a cell to himself with a shower, while Giovanni Pandico, his own personal cook and underwriter occupied the cell next door so that he could serve up dishes on request. When he was transferred to a smaller penitentiary (where his cell was carpeted, and fitted with a colour television and sound system) in Ascoli Piceno, he requested that Pandico follow him, and his request was promptly granted by the prison authorities. Cutolo referred to the prison as "the state of Poggioreale" and is once reported to have stated, "I am the king of the Camorra. I take from the rich and give to the poor." As a prisoner, he dressed impeccably with ties and designer shirts, a gold watch and shoes of crocodile skin. His daily meals consisted of lobster and champagne.

The Justice Department found out that between 5 March 1981 and 18 April 1982, Cutolo received money orders for an amount of 55,962,000 lire (the equivalent in 1982 of $55,000) to take care of his daily expenses, of which he reportedly spent half (30,600,000 lire or $29,000) on food and clothes. As Cutolo spent most of his time behind bars from where he sent out his instructions, the everyday running of the enterprise was entrusted to his elder sister Rosetta Cutolo. Her nickname was "Occh'egghiaccio", meaning Ice Eyes.

Rosetta, a grey-haired, pious-looking woman, lived alone for years, tending her roses. She ruled in the Castle Mediceo, the headquarters of the organisation: a vast 16th-century palace with 365 rooms and a large park with tennis courts and swimming pool. The castle was bought for several billion lire, and provided direct contact for Cutolo from the prisons of Poggioreale and Ascoli Piceno. Brilliant with figures, Rosetta Cutolo negotiated with South American cocaine barons, narrowly failed to blow up a police headquarters and was glamorised in a film, Il Camorrista.

After her plan to blow up a police headquarters narrowly failed, her stronghold was raided; Cutolo escaped under a rug in a car driven boldly past checkpoints by the neighbourhood priest. She then went underground, remaining at liberty for the next 10 years. In 1993 she gave herself up and was charged only with mafia association: prosecutors alleged she had been running her brother's organisation. She was acquitted nine times of murder. Rosetta had persuaded the authorities she was harmless, and her frumpy image definitely helped.

However, Raffaele Cutolo has always maintained that Rosetta knew nothing of his criminal activities and did only what he asked: "Rosetta has never been a Camorrista... She only listened to me and sent me a few suitcases of money to prisoners like i told her to." Nevertheless, it is clear that Cutolo had always wanted to maintain a male-only organization based on principles such as criminal fraternity and so could never be seen giving a role to his sister. It could be argued that he did not want to implicate her and therefore, always insisted that she was innocent.

Moreover, many important members did not believe that she held an important role because she was a woman. For instance, former NCO lieutenant and pentiti, Pasquale Barra argued: "What has Rosa Cutolo got to do with it? What have woman got to do with the Camorra?"

Raffaele Cutolo decided to expand the Camorra to Apulia. The outcome was not what he had planned. At first local criminals were managing the illegal trades while the Camorra lent financial resources and support demanding 40% of all profits derived from illegal activities. This arrangement proved to be an unstable one: soon the local criminals tried to free themselves from the masters. In 1981, one of them, Giuseppe Rogoli, founded the Sacra Corona Unita, a new Mafia invoking the regional Pugliese identity against the intrusion of the foreign Neapolitans.

Nuova Camorra Organizzata–Nuova Famiglia feud 
The NCO spread like wildfire in the crisis-ridden Campanian towns of the late 1970s, offering alienated youths an alternative to a lifetime of unemployment or poorly paid jobs. Hundreds of young men were employed as enforcers. Initially, the main specialisation of NCO gangs was extorting money through protection rackets from local businesses. While the traditional Camorristic families held territorial powers and the consequent responsibility over their controlled areas, the NCO had no qualms over breaking the established social fabric by extorting shopkeepers, small factories and businesses, and building contractors. In its quest for cash, it even targeted individuals such as landlords, lawyers and professionals. The NCO's protection racket even included a transient circus.

The NCO later branched out to cocaine trafficking, partly because it was less subject to police investigation than heroin, but also because the Sicilian Mafia was less involved in the cocaine trade.

At the end of the 1970s two different types of Camorra organisations were beginning to take shape. On one side there was Cutolo's NCO, which dealt mainly in cocaine and protection rackets, preserving a strong regional sense of identify. On the other side, the business-oriented Camorra clans linked to the Sicilian Cosa Nostra like the clans of Michele Zaza and Lorenzo Nuvoletta, who dealt in cigarettes and heroin, but soon moved on to invest in real estate and construction firms.

Cutolo's NCO became more powerful by encroaching and taking over other group's territories. The NCO was able to break the circle of traditional power held by the families. Cutolo's organisation was too aggressive and violent to be resisted by any individual families. Other Camorra families initially were too weakened, too divided, and simply too intimidated by the NCO. He requested that if other criminal groups wanted to keep their business, they had to pay the NCO protection on all their activities, including a percentage for each carton of cigarettes smuggled into Naples. This practice came to be known as ICA (Imposta Camorra Aggiunta, or Camorristic Sale Tax), mimicking the state VAT sale tax IVA (Imposta sul Valore Aggiunto). For instance, Michele Zaza, the biggest Neapolitan cigarette smuggler, was reported to have paid the NCO more than 4 billion lire in the first three months after the imposition of the racket.

However, no hierarchy between Camorra gangs or stable spheres of influence had been created, and no gang leader was likely to agree to be subdued by Cutolo without making a fight of it. In 1978, Zaza formed a ‘honourable brotherhood’ (onorata fratellanza) in an attempt to get the Sicilian mafia-aligned Camorra gangs to oppose Cutolo and his NCO, although without much success. A year later, in 1979, the more successful Nuova Famiglia was formed to contrast Cutolo's NCO. It consisted of various powerful and charismatic Camorra clan leaders from the areas around Naples, such Carmine Alfieri of Saviano, Pasquale Galasso of Poggiomarino, Mario Fabbrocino of the Vesuvius area, the Nuvoletta clan of Marano, Antonio Bardellino from Casal di Principe (patriarch of the so-called "Casalesi") and Michele Zaza, known as o Pazzo or the Madman from Portici who made France his base of operations. From 1980 to 1983 a bloody war raged in and around Naples, which left several hundred dead and severely weakened the NCO. Between 16 and 19 June 1983, police arrested a thousand members of the NCO.

Cirillo kidnapping

Cutolo has been instrumental in obtaining the release of Ciro Cirillo, the Christian Democrat member of the regional government of Campania ("assessore") in charge of Urban Planning, who had been abducted by the Red Brigades in April 1981. He was released within three months because, so rumour has it, the Christian Democrats paid Cutolo to use his influence with the Red Brigades.

Publicly the Christian Democrats had refused to negotiate with terrorists, but privately leading politicians and members of the secret services visited Cutolo in prison and asked him to negotiate with imprisoned members of the Red Brigades. A large ransom was paid to win Cirillo's release. In return, Cutolo allegedly asked for a slackening of police operations against the Camorra, for control over the tendering of building contracts in Campania (a lucrative venture since Campania was hit by a devastating earthquake in November 1980) and for a reduction of his own sentence – as well as new psychiatric test to show that he is not responsible for his actions. Both these last concessions were granted.

Decline

Cutolo overplayed his hand in the Cirillo affair. His former political protectors turned and provided their support to his main rival Carmine Alfieri. When his main 'military' chief, Vincenzo Casillo was killed in January 1983 by the allies of Alfieri, it was clear Cutolo had lost the war. His power declined considerably. Not only Cutolo but many other Camorra gangs understood the shift in the balance of power caused by the death of Casillo. They abandoned the NCO and allied themselves with Alfieri. His sister who ran the business was arrested in 1993. He was moved to a prison on the island Asinara, far away from Naples and his ability to communicate with the outside was severely restricted when the harsh 41-bis prison regime was imposed upon him.

In 2005, he asked for clemency in a letter to the Italian President. "I am tired and ill. I want to spend my last years at home." In 1983 he married Immacolata in prison. The couple never consummated their marriage. A six-year legal battle allowed Cutolo the right to father a child, Denise, through artificial insemination.

Cutolo had previously had a son, Roberto, from a previous marriage who was shot dead in Tradate on 24 December 1990, aged 28, in gang violence. His killers were later found dead, their faces riddled with bullets. The murder had been ordered by Mario Fabbrocino, the boss of the Fabbrocino clan, as revenge for Cutolo ordering the death of his brother, Francesco, in the 1980s. Fabbrocino was eventually convicted of Roberto's murder and sentenced to life imprisonment in 2005.

Personality 
Cutolo thought of himself as a predestined man with supernatural powers, able to heal the wounded and raise the dead. Various psychiatric examinations assessed him to be a psychotic, an hysteric and a megalomaniac. He thought that he had been sent to earth to save the Neapolitan people. As he said during a trial in 1980: 

During a psychiatric evaluation, Cutolo claimed to have revived his aunt when he was eighteen. One night she had entered into what had appeared to be an irreversible coma. Cutolo went close to her and said: "Get up! We don't have the money for your funeral." She then got up. According to Adriano Baglivo of the Corriere della Sera, the old lady came back to consciousness due to the emergency care of a physician familiar with her history of catatonic attacks. However, for Cutolo this episode assumed the character of a miracle and sign of his inner powers.

When Valerio Fioravanti, a Neo-fascist and fellow Poggioreale inmate sentenced for political terrorism asked Cutolo the reason for his charisma, he replied: "Naples is divided into lords and beggars. If I have charisma, it is because I can offer a prompt promotion from the second category to the first one".

In prison, Cutolo received a significant amount of fan mail from youth who were impressed with his achievements as well as his ability to outsmart the authorities. Generally viewing themselves as marginal and exploited, they were attracted by his notoriety, flamboyant personality and charisma. For instance, a letter from two teenage girls from Acerra which were intercepted by prison authorities read as follows: 

During an interview with the media, Cutolo reminisced about his life:

Death
On 17 February 2021, Cutolo died in the prison unit of the Maggiore Hospital in Parma, at the age of 79.

Biography and film
 Marrazzo, Giuseppe (1984/2005). Il camorrista. Vita segreta di don Raffaele Cutolo, Naples: Tullio Pironti, 
 Il Camorrista (1986), directed by Giuseppe Tornatore. Vaguely inspired by the real story of Cutolo. Cutolo is played by Ben Gazzara, with the Italian voiceover done by Italian actor Mariano Rigillo.
 The story of Raffaele Cutolo inspired one of the most famous songs of Fabrizio De André, entitled "Don Raffaé (Clouds of 1990)".

Footnotes

References
Behan, Tom (1996). The Camorra, London: Routledge, 
Fiandaca, Giovanni (ed.) (2007), Women and the Mafia: Female Roles in Organized Crime Structures, New York: Springer 
Haycraft, John (1985). The Italian Labyrinth: Italy in the 1980s, London: Secker & Warburg
Jacquemet, Marco (1996). Credibility in Court: Communicative Practices in the Camorra Trials, Cambridge University Press 
 Sciarrone, Rocco (1998). Mafie vecchie, mafie nuove: Radicamento ed espansione, Rome: Donzelli Editore 
Stille, Alexander (1995). Excellent Cadavers. The Mafia and the Death of the First Italian Republic, New York: Vintage

External links
 , Rai Tre 
 , Rai Tre

1941 births
2021 deaths
People from Ottaviano
Camorristi
Camorristi sentenced to life imprisonment
Nuova Camorra Organizzata
Italian people convicted of murder
People convicted of murder by Italy
Italian prisoners sentenced to life imprisonment
Prisoners sentenced to life imprisonment by Italy
Prisoners who died in Italian detention
Escapees from Italian detention